Francis Lake may refer to:

Canada
 Francis Lake (Vancouver Island), in British Columbia

United States
 Francis Lake (California), in El Dorado County, California
 Francis Lake (New York), in Lewis County, New York

See also 
Frances Lake, in Yukon, Canada
Francia Lake, in Bolivia
Lake Frances (disambiguation)
Lake Francis (disambiguation)